The following is a list of artists who have performed on Later... with Jools Holland.

See also 
 List of Later... with Jools Holland episodes

External links
 BBC Two - Later... with Jools Holland - Episode guide

Later with Jools Holland, performers on